Bernhard Seliger is the book review editor of North Korean Review and a representative of the Hanns Seidel Foundation branch in Seoul, South Korea.

Selected publications
 The July 2002 Reforms in North Korea: Liberman-Style Reforms or Road to Transformation? (2005)
 Income, Wealth, and Political Power in North Korea (2006)
 Monetary and Exchange Rate Policy in North Korea: A Tentative Appraisal (2007)

See also
 Hanns Seidel Foundation
 Institute for North Korean Studies
 North Korean Review

Notes

External links
 Hanns Seidel Foundation in Korea website (Korean, English, German)
 Institute for North Korean Studies website
 North Korean Review website

Living people
Year of birth missing (living people)
People from Seoul